The Silveh Dam is an earth-fill embankment dam on the Lavin River just downstream of the village of Silveh in Piranshahr County, West Azerbaijan Province, Iran. The primary purpose of the dam is interbasin transfer for irrigation. Since completion, a tunnel and canals shift water from the reservoir north to the Chaparabad area. Construction on the dam began in 2004 and it was expected to be complete by the end of 2015. The dam was effectively completed as of 2018. The village of Silveh will be flooded when the reservoir is impounded.

The reservoir created by the dam will store  of water. About  of water will be transferred through the tunnel annually while an estimated  will be sent downstream to Piranshahr during the same period.

See also

Sardasht Dam – under construction downstream
List of dams and reservoirs in Iran

References

Dams in West Azerbaijan Province
Piranshahr County
Earth-filled dams
Interbasin transfer
Dams in the Tigris River basin